Liometopum rhenana is an extinct species of Oligocene ant in the genus Liometopum. Described by Meunier in 1917, the fossils were found in Germany.

References

†
Oligocene insects
Prehistoric insects of Europe
Fossil taxa described in 1917
Fossil ant taxa